The Communications Satellite Act of 1962 was put into effect in order to deal with the issue of commercialization of space communications.  This act was very controversial, and was left very open-ended.  The act was signed August 31, 1962 by President John F. Kennedy.

Goals of the act
The act aimed to join together private communication companies in order to make satellites more obtainable.

Disagreement with the passing of the act
Democratic Senator Russell B. Long of Louisiana said of the act, "When this bill first started out I thought it was as crooked as a dog's hind leg.  I am now convinced that that would be a compliment.  This bill is as crooked as a barrel of snakes."  The American Telephone and Telegraph Company argued that using space for communications was just a modern representation of the submarine communications cables currently in use.  AT&T proposed joint ownership of all of the communications satellites, with control based on the system facilities, but since AT&T had a majority of world communications this proposition was opposed by other communication companies.  The Federal Communications Commission proposed that the ten companies join together in a program, but this was put down with antitrust legislation.

The compromise allowing the bill to pass was that there would be government regulation on the communication industry.  The United States Congress made it so that all companies registered by the FCC had nondiscriminatory access to the satellite systems.  This would allow competition to develop among the companies, thus preventing trusts from forming.  The United States Government, including the President, NASA, and the FCC, were all to maintain certain duties to monitor the communications satellites.  The President was to observe every aspect of the development and operation of the satellite systems.  He is also responsible for providing arrangements with foreign participation.  NASA was designated as a technical advisor for the FCC and the communications corporation to the extent that would aid the nation.  NASA was to receive reimbursement for the services it rendered.  The largest burden on regulation falls on the FCC.  The FCC was deemed responsible for making sure that competition is present, and that small businesses would be able to participate.

Regulation committees established
The Act created a board of directors to oversee regulation of the act.  There are to be 15 members of this board; three appointed by the president, six chosen by public stock holders, and the remaining six chosen by communication carriers that are authorized by the FCC.  This board of directors is to control the public satellite systems.  Stock shares for this Board were to be sold for $100.  This would provide finances for the board.

The completed act
The act was very ambiguous about the responsibilities of the regulators and the direction that the companies were to go; however, the act provided a good start towards a global communications system.  Section 301 of the Act provided Congress the right to "repeal, alter, or amend." This would be necessary in order make clear the future regulation done by the committees established by the act.

Comments on the act after passing
The year after the act passed, President Lyndon B. Johnson reported to Congress that, "act is progressing well in light of the complexities of the problem." Yet, at this point little had actually been accomplished.  There had been no communication satellites launched and only some research had been conducted to provide moving for moving forward.  President Johnson's next report to congress was on March 17, 1967.  Here he reported that, "the Communications Satellite Act of 1962 [has] brought mankind to the threshold of a full-time global communications service to which all nations of the world may have equal access." At this point in time much had been accomplished towards a global communications system.  COMSAT had been joined by 17 nations for the creation of INTELSAT, International Telecommunications Satellite Consortium (Columbia Encyclopedia).  Fifty five nations had joined INTELSAT, which was a consortium established to provide an intergovernmental owning of communications satellites.  INTELSAT was created at a time when private companies were unwilling to invest in Satellite technology shortly after the passing of the Communications Satellite act of 1962 (Gruenwald 1998).

References

Further reading
Harvard Law Review. THE COMMUNICATIONS SATELLITE ACT OF 1962 (December 1962). Vol. 76 Issue 2, p156-168, 13p; (AN 15226548)
 Message to the Congress Transmitting Annual Report on Communications Satellite Activities. April 2, 1968. (01/01/2001). American Reference Library; (AN 9FVPPLBJ050176)
 Message to the Congress Transmitting Annual Report Under the Communications Satellite Act. March 17, 1967 (01/01/2001). American Reference Library; (AN 9FVPPLBJ040123)
 Statement by the President Upon Making Public His Report to the Congress on Communications Satellites February 10, 1964 (01/01/2001). American Reference Library; (AN 9FVPPLBJ010181)
 Remarks Upon Signing the Communications Satellite Act. August 31, 1962 (01/01/2001). American Reference Library; (AN 9FVPPJFK020356)
Gruenwald, Juliana.  Satellite service privatization gets House panel's approval (3/28/98). Congressional Quarterly Weekly Report. Vol. 56 Issue 13, p816, 1p, 1bw; (AN 442562).
“Communications Satellite” The Columbia Encyclopedia, 6th ed. New York: Columbia University Press, 2001–04. www.bartleby.com/65/. [2/2/2007].

1962 in American law
1962
United States federal communications legislation
87th United States Congress